Julio Alberto Crisosto Zárate (born 21 March 1950) is a Chilean former footballer who played in 5 clubs in Chile and the Chile national football team in the 1975 Copa América.

Teams
 Universidad Católica 1970-1973
 Colo Colo 1974-1979
 Los Náuticos 1980-81
 Panathinaikos 1981
 Deportes Arica 1982–83
 Santiago Wanderers 1983
 Deportes Linares 1983

Titles

Club
Colo Colo
 Chilean Primera División (1): 1979
 Copa Chile (1): 1074

International
Chile
  (1): 
  (1): 
  (1): 
 Copa Acosta Ñu (1): 1974

Honours
 Colo Colo 1974 (Top Scorer Chilean Championship)

References

External links
 
 
 
 Julio Crisosto at playmakerstats.com (English version of ceroacero.es)
 Julio Crisosto  at MemoriaWanderers 

1950 births
Living people
People from Iquique
Chilean footballers
Chile international footballers
Club Deportivo Universidad Católica footballers
Colo-Colo footballers
Naval de Talcahuano footballers
Panathinaikos F.C. players
San Marcos de Arica footballers
Santiago Wanderers footballers
Deportes Linares footballers
Chilean Primera División players
Super League Greece players
Primera B de Chile players
Chilean expatriate sportspeople in Greece
Expatriate footballers in Greece
1975 Copa América players
Association football forwards